The 2019 American Athletic Conference men's soccer season was the 7th season of men's varsity soccer in the conference. The season began on August 30, 2019, and concluded on November 5, 2019. The regular season culminated with the 2019 American Athletic Conference Men's Soccer Tournament, which was held from November 9 to November 16.

The defending regular season and tournament champions, UCF and SMU, respectively, successfully defended their title. Both UCF, SMU, as well as South Florida were selected by the NCAA Selection Committee to the 2019 NCAA Division I Men's Soccer Tournament. SMU reached the quarterfinals before losing to eventual national runners-up, Virginia. UCF lost to SMU in the Sweet Sixteen, and South Florida lost to Louisville in the first round.

Background

Previous season 

The 2018 regular season was won by UCF, who finished conference play with a 5–1–1 record, and won on tiebreakers against SMU. SMU won the 2018 American Tournament, defeating UCF 5–4 in penalty kicks following a 1–1 draw in regulation and overtime. SMU earned the conference's automatic berth into the NCAA Tournament, while UCF and Connecticut received at-large berths into the tournament. In the NCAA Tournament, SMU lost in the first round to Oregon State. Connecticut beat rivals, Rhode Island, in the first round, before losing to Indiana in the second round. UCF was one of the 16 seeded teams (seeded 14th), allowing them to earn a bye into the second round. There, they lost in overtime to Lipscomb.

Following the season, Cal Jennings won the Offensive MVP award for the conference. Jacob Hauser-Ramsey of Connecticut won the Defensive MVP. Fellow UCF players, Louis Perez, Yannik Oettl, and Scott Calabrese won the AAC Midfielder, Goalkeeper, and Coach of the Year awards, respectively. Perez and Jennings were also named All-Americans by United Soccer Coaches.

Emil Cuello was the first AAC player to be drafted in the 2019 MLS SuperDraft, when he was selected by the LA Galaxy with the 19th overall pick in the first round of the draft.

Head coaches

Preseason

Preseason poll 

The preseason poll was released on August 20, 2019. UCF was picked to win the regular season.

Preseason national rankings 
The preseason national rankings were announced in August 2019. United Soccer Coaches, Soccer America, and TopDrawerSoccer.com do a Top-25 preseason poll. CollegeSoccerNews.com do a Top-30 preseason poll.

Preseason All-Conference teams 

Preseason All-AAC Team

Regular season

Players of the Week

Rankings

United Soccer

Top Drawer Soccer

Postseason

AAC Tournament 

The 2019 Tournament will be held at the home ground of the regular season winner.

NCAA Tournament

Postseason awards and honors

Conference honors 

 denotes unanimous selection

National honors

American vs other conferences 

Regular Season

Post Season

MLS SuperDraft

Total picks by school

List of selections

Homegrown contracts 
The Homegrown Player Rule is a Major League Soccer program that allows MLS teams to sign local players from their own development academies directly to MLS first team rosters. Before the creation of the rule in 2008, every player entering Major League Soccer had to be assigned through one of the existing MLS player allocation processes, such as the MLS SuperDraft.

To place a player on its homegrown player list, making him eligible to sign as a homegrown player, players must have resided in that club's home territory and participated in the club's youth development system for at least one year. Players can play college soccer and still be eligible to sign a homegrown contract.

References

External links 
 American Athletic Conference Men's Soccer

 
2019 NCAA Division I men's soccer season